Myshkin (Мы́шкин) is a Russian-language surname, also transliterated Mishkin and  Miskin, although the latter two words have other meanings, both in Russian and in other languages. "Myshkin" is the possessive case of the Russian word myshka, the diminutive of  'mouse'. 

Notable people with this surname include:

 Anatoly Myshkin (b. 1954), Soviet and Russian basketball player
 Ippolit Myshkin (1848–1885), Russian revolutionary
 Vladimir Myshkin (b. 1955), Soviet and Russian ice hockey goaltender

Fictional characters
 Prince Myshkin, character in Dostoevsky's novel The Idiot

See also

 Mishkin, surname
 Miskin (disambiguation)

Russian-language surnames